Valdeir Celso Moreira (born 31 December 1967 in Brazil) is a Brazilian retired footballer.

Career

He was nicknamed "The Flash" for his speed.

From 1992 to 1996, Valdeir played for Bordeaux in the French Ligue 1. There, he was teammates with Zinedine Zidane, who he unsuccessfully tried to make dance Samba for a goal celebration.

References

External links

 Valdeir Celso Moreira at National Football Teams

Brazilian footballers
Living people
1967 births
Association football midfielders
Association football forwards
Brazil international footballers
Botafogo de Futebol e Regatas players
FC Girondins de Bordeaux players
São Paulo FC players
CR Flamengo footballers